Grendel is a 2007 American action-fantasy television film directed by Nick Lyon and very loosely based on the Anglo-Saxon epic poem Beowulf. The television film was produced by the Sci Fi channel as an original movie for broadcasting on the Sci Fi cable television network, and began airing on January 13, 2007. In 2010 it was released on DVD from the sister company by Universal Pictures.

Synopsis 
Beowulf, hero of many stories, is asked by some villagers to kill a monster living nearby. Together with his protégé Finn he goes in search of the monster and finally locates it in a cave, which he enters alone. The monster turns out to be a gigantic snake, which Beowulf beheads. Later, Beowulf, Finn, his uncle King Higlack and a few men sets out on his ship towards Denmark to help the Danes fighting against the monster Grendel.

On board Beowulf tells the story of King Hrothgar, who became King of the Danes and founded a city that could compete with Rome. One day a wyvern-like monster ("Hag") appeared and terrorised his kingdom. As a result, Queen Wealhþeow went mad and one of their two sons was killed fighting the Hag; the royal family had to leave the city and settle in one of the villages. Just before the winged monster apparently died, she gave birth to Grendel.

On the ship, Beowulf receives a special crossbow from King Higlack, with which he thinks he could kill Grendel. When they reach the beach, Beowulf and a few dozen warriors go ashore; Finn joins them, after Beowulf swore to the king that nothing will happen to him. In the forest bordering the coast they are greeted by Prince Unferth, who has already monitored their arrival with Captain Wulfgar. He mocks the warriors, but then allows them to meet the king, albeit unarmed. King Hrothgar greets Beowulf like an old friend and is very pleased with his offer of help. They move to the abandoned city to have a feast, since the noise used to attract Grendel in the past.

At the feast Ingrid, a member of the royal family, starts flirting with Finn: the two kiss watched by the jealous Unferth, who also has feelings for Ingrid. Very drunk, Unferth provokes Finn and then Beowulf, whom he questions about less glorious stories and ridicules him. King Hrothgar is deeply disappointed with his son and orders him to stop his foolish behavior. After being knocked off by Beowulf in one blow, because he wanted to challenge him to a sword fight, Grendel appears in the courtyard and attacks the guards. Beowulf and his men attack the monster but Beowulf misses it several times with the explosive bolts of the crossbow. Eventually the monster escapes after causing a bloodbath.

The following day, Beowulf discusses again with the royal family. While Unferth blames him for the tragedy, Beowulf gets the king to admit that he had been able to keep Grendel calm for the last few years through child sacrifices, as his predecessor did with Hag: this is why there are no more children on the island. Beowulf decides then to look for Grendel on his own, and order Wulfgar to bomb the forest with burning barrels, in order to lure Grendel out. While the rest of the group stays behind and is ambushed by Grendel, Beowulf is able to shoot it in the head with one of the bolts and then pierce his heart. As proof of his death, he takes Grendel's arm with him.

King Hrothgar is delighted with the result and generously rewards the heroes. While Beowulf and his people head for the ship to return home, it becomes clear that Grendel's mother, Hag, was never dead and now wants to avenge her son. She kidnaps Ingrid, prompting the royal family to call Beowulf back; Unferth and Finn, however, take up the chase separately. Ingrid manages to free herself, but now walks aimlessly in the forest; Unferth protects her from Hag, but pays for it with his life. As he dies, he confesses his love for her and asks her to tell his parents that he is sorry for his brother's death and that he asks for forgiveness.

When Hag returns to capture Ingrid again, Finn jumps in between them and manages to injure the monster, but he is abducted by Hag. Now Beowulf, Wulfgar and the royal couple arrive on site and Beowulf decides to hunt Hag alone; King Hrothgar then recommends him to use the sword he will find at the entrance of Hag's cave. In the vicinity of the cave he finds indeed the sword and a little later the seriously injured Finn. Now Hag ambushes Beowulf, whose attempts to hit the flying monster fail miserably, and throws him against a rock. Just before Hag can give Beowulf the fatal blow, Finn shoots her in the back with the crossbow. Hag then turns to Finn but Beowulf seizes the opportunity and beheads her with the sword. He brings the head to the king as proof and carry the seriously injured Finn to the village.

In the credits Beowulf is shown on a ship heading for new adventures. Finn and Ingrid stay together and have a child: after the deaths of Grendel and Hag, peace has returned.

Cast
 Chris Bruno as Beowulf
 Ben Cross as King Hrothgar
 Marina Sirtis as Queen Onela
 Chuck Hittinger as Finn
  as Unferth
  as Ingrid
  as Wulfgar
 Andrey Slabakov as Eclaf
  as King Higlack
 Maxim Genchev as Olf (as Maxim Gentchev)
 Raicho Vasilev as Sigmund
 Ivo Simeonov as McGowin
 Ruslan Kupenov as Rafel
 Assen Blatechki as Renn
 Todor Chapkanov as Sentry
  as Captain (as Vlado Mihaylov)
 George Zlatarev as Deserter

Reception 
Nickolas Haydock, in the essay "Making Sacrifices" from the Beowulf on Film collection, called the film "highly derivative" and "regrettable".

On Rotten Tomatoes, the film has a poor rating of just 27% with over 100 reviews. In the Internet Movie Database, the film has a rating of 3.5 out of 10.0 stars with almost 1,000 votes cast.

References

External links
 

2007 television films
2007 films
Syfy original films
2007 science fiction films
2007 fantasy films
Films based on Beowulf
Films based on Norse mythology
Films set in Denmark
Films set in the 6th century
Films shot in Bulgaria
Films directed by Nick Lyon
2000s American films